Phoebe (Feben, Phebe) [Koine Greek: ; , , ] was a first-century Christian woman mentioned by the Apostle Paul in his Epistle to the Romans, verses . A notable woman in the church of Cenchreae, she was trusted by Paul to deliver his letter to the Romans. Paul refers to her both as a "servant" or "deacon" (Greek diakonos) and as a helper or patron of many (Greek prostatis). This is the only place in the New Testament where a woman is specifically referred to with these two distinctions. Paul introduces Phoebe as his emissary to the church in Rome and, because they are not acquainted with her, Paul provides them with her credentials.

Background

Paul's letter to the Romans was written in Corinth sometime between the years 56 and 58, in order to solicit support for an anticipated missionary journey to Spain. Although he had not yet visited Rome, Paul would have been familiar with the community and its circumstances through Priscilla and Aquila, who were in Corinth, having previously lived in Rome. Biblical scholars are divided as to whether Chapter 16, Paul's letter of recommendation for Phoebe, was intended for Rome, with whose Christian community he was not acquainted, or with the more familiar community at Ephesus.

The name Phoebe means "pure", "radiant", or "bright"; and was the name of a Titan in Greek mythology.

Some scholars believe Phoebe was responsible for delivering Paul's epistle to the Roman Christian church.

Phoebe is the only woman named as deacon in the Bible.

Greek terms for her titles

diakonos
Apostle Paul used the Greek diakonos (διάκονος) to designate Phoebe as a deacon. "Deacon" is a transliteration of the Greek, and in Paul's writings sometimes refers to a Christian designated to serve as a specially-appointed "assistant" to the overseers of a church, and at others refers to "servants" in a general sense. In the letter to the Romans, apart from the debated case of Phoebe, it always refers to "servants" in the generic sense, as opposed to a church office. However, at this inaugural stage in the Church's formation it is no doubt premature to think of offices as being consistent or clearly defined, and Rosalba Manes argues that Paul's use of the term "deacon" suggests that, like Stephen and Philip, Phoebe's ministry may have extended beyond charitable works to include preaching and evangelization.

"Likewise the women"
While some scholars believe Paul restricted the office of deacon to men, others do not, since, when describing the qualities that the office-holders called "deacons" must possess, Paul wrote in  gunaikas (Greek for "women") hosautos (Greek for "likewise"), translated "likewise the women." They, likewise, are to be "worthy of respect, not malicious talkers but temperate and trustworthy in everything."

prostatis
In classical Greek the word prostates (προστάτης) (feminine, prostatis) was used to mean either a chief or leader, or a guardian or protector, often in a religious context; it was later used also to translate the Roman concept of a patron. The Apostle Paul's use indicates that its range of meanings had not changed by New Testament times.  This suggests that Phoebe was a woman of means, who, among other things, contributed financial support to Paul's apostolate, and probably hosted the house church of Cenchreae in her home, as well as, providing shelter and hospitality to Paul when in the town.

Veneration
The Roman Catholic Church, Eastern Orthodox Church and Episcopal Church in the United States of America place her feast day as September 3 (the latter designating it a Lesser Feast). 

The Lutheran Church–Missouri Synod remembers her a little earlier, on October 25. The Calendar of Saints of the Evangelical Lutheran Church in America commemorates Phoebe with Lydia of Thyatira and Dorcas on January 27, the day after the commemoration of the early male missionaries Silas, Timothy and Titus and two days after the feast of the Conversion of St. Paul.

See also
 Romans 16

References

Further reading
 Household Names: Michael Peppard, "Junia, Phoebe, & Prisca in Early Christian Rome", 23 April 2018, Commonweal

External links 
St Phoebe - Catholic Online

1st-century Christian female saints
Catholic deaconesses
Christian saints from the New Testament
Saints from Roman Greece
People in the Pauline epistles
Women in the New Testament